Unsaturated-phospholipid methyltransferase may refer to:

 Methylene-fatty-acyl-phospholipid synthase
 Cyclopropane-fatty-acyl-phospholipid synthase